Piattsville is an unincorporated community in Adams Township, Parke County, in the U.S. state of Indiana.

History
A post office was established at Piattsville in 1856, and remained in operation until it was discontinued in 1862. According to Ronald L. Baker, the community bears the name of a settler or family of settlers.

Geography

References

Unincorporated communities in Parke County, Indiana
Unincorporated communities in Indiana